The development of LGBT culture in Philadelphia can be traced back to the early 20th century.  It exists in current times as a dynamic, diverse, and philanthropically active culture with establishments and events held to promote LGBT culture and rights in Philadelphia and beyond.

History 
The Philadelphia LGBT community has roots as far back as the 1930s and 1940s. Early gay networks would meet privately at underground house parties and other private venues within Center City, West Philadelphia, and Germantown.  The post-WWII Center City area provided plentiful housing and urban anonymity that allowed the LGBT culture to meet hidden from public view.

By the 1950s, a jazz, espresso, and beatnik culture was stirring things up around Rittenhouse Square and in coffee houses on Sansom Street, creating a niche for the city's gay community.

In the mid-1900s, conflicts between homosexual and heterosexual communities were common within Center City neighborhoods. Gays and lesbians were found commonly living around Rittenhouse Square and saw Rittenhouse Square Park as a safety zone for camaraderie. Gay men used the park as a place to find other men. Hippies and pre-Stonewall gays were also part of their own groups there.

The LGBT culture developing in Philadelphia eventually inspired the first article published in America that recognized a city's gay community and political scene, which was titled "The Furtive Fraternity" (1962, by Gaeton Fonzi) and published in Greater Philadelphia.  The article describes political limitations the emerging gay community faced.

In 1962 the Janus Society was founded in Philadelphia; it is notable as the publisher of Drum magazine, one of the earliest LGBT-interest publications in the United States and most widely circulated in the 1960s, and for its role in organizing many of the nation's earliest LGBT rights demonstrations. The Janus Society takes its name from the Roman two-faced God Janus of beginnings, endings, and doorways. The organization focused on a policy of militant respectability, a strategy demanding respect by showing the public LGBT individuals conforming to hetero-normative standards of dress at protests.

On April 25, 1965 over 150 people were denied service at Dewey's, a local coffee shop and diner at 
219 South 17th Street in Philadelphia, near Rittenhouse Square. Those denied service were variously described at the time as “homosexuals,” “masculine women,” “feminine men,” and “persons wearing non-conformist clothing.” Three teenagers (reported by the Janus Society and Drum to be two males and one female) staged a sit-in that day. After restaurant managers contacted police, the three were arrested. In the process of offering legal support for the teens, local activist and president of the Janus Society, Clark Polak, was also arrested. Demonstrations took place outside the establishment over the next five days with 1500 flyers being distributed by the Janus Society and its supporters. Three people staged a second sit-in on May 2, 1965. The police were again called, but refused to make arrests this time. The Janus Society said the protests were successful in preventing further arrests and the action was deemed “the first sit-in of its kind in the history of the United States” by Drum magazine. In 2018 a historical marker was placed at 17th and St. James streets to commemorate the Dewey’s sit-ins.

The Annual Reminders were a series of early pickets organized by LGBTQ organizations, which took place each July 4 at Independence Hall beginning in 1965 and were among the earliest LGBT demonstrations in the United States. The events were designed to inform and remind the American people that LGBT people did not enjoy basic civil rights protections. The Reminders were held each year until 1969, with the final picket taking place shortly after the June 28 Stonewall riot in New York City, considered the flashpoint of the modern gay liberation movement. Reminder organizers decided to discontinue the July 4 pickets. Instead, they organized the Christopher Street Liberation Day demonstration held June 28, 1970, to commemorate the anniversary of the riot. In 2005 a historical marker was placed at 6th and Chestnut Streets to commemorate the Annual Reminders.

Philadelphia's first Gay Pride Parade was held in Rittenhouse Square on June 11, 1972. The event was hosted by several organizations including the Gay Activists Alliance, the Homophile Action League, Radicalesbians and groups from Penn State and Temple University. The route started down Chestnut Street and ended at Independence Park. Speakers included Barbara Gittings and Jerry Curtis.

In 2014, gay transgender man Lou Cutler became the first openly transgender man to be crowned Mr. Gay Philadelphia. In 2020, Philly Leather crowned the contest's first non-binary winner, Mx. Philadelphia Leather Diamond d'Ant.

In 2021, after organizing PrideDay in June and OutFest in October for 32 years, Philly Pride Presents abruptly dissolved facing community accusations of mismanagement, racism, and transphobia. In the wake, a local group of LGBTQ+ volunteers reimagining pride formed a new group called PHL Pride Collective.

The Gayborhood 
Washington Square West, commercially called Midtown Village, is mainly referred to as "The Gayborhood” by the locals."  Since the 1920s this area has been a mecca for fashion and entertainment.  During the 1960s a transition from high-end stage performances and chorus lines into cheap adult entertainment took place.  "Musical bars" on Camac and Quince Streets hosted gay and lesbian clientele but required a fee to mob connections for law enforcement to look the other way.   The preservation of these bars around 13th and Locust Streets, through dealings with the mob, made gay culture appear more closely tied to illegal activity, which drew attention from the authorities.

The lumping together of prostitutes, drug dealers, and homosexuals provoked police raids on gay bars up into the early 1980s.  During this time, demonstrations at Independence Hall for gay rights sought to raise the community from an underground and lascivious group into a more unified community and political entity. This same area of the city remains an epicenter for gay culture today.

This Washington Square West district was selected to undergo gentrification in the mid-1970s and up to one-fifth of the old structures were razed.  Shortly after the project began, federal assistance was discontinued and the district's demolished lots sat unoccupied during a long recovery period into the 1990s. Mayor Ed Rendell promoted a new era of gentrification which helped Washington Square West regain its footing and transform into a healthy, economically viable community by the early 2000s.

In 2007, 36 rainbow street signs were mounted throughout intersections within 11th and Broad Streets, formally recognizing the Gayborhood as part of Philadelphia culture.

There are additional neighborhoods in Philadelphia with sizeable and/or growing LGBT populations: East Passyunk Crossing has been dubbed by some as the "New Gayborhood", and Mount Airy has a significant number of lesbian households.

Community Organizations

Galaei 
GALAEI fights for access, opportunity, sexual empowerment, and economic justice while fighting systemic oppression, structural racism, discrimination, and white supremacy.

Mazzoni Center 
The Mazzoni Center, established in 1979, is the only healthcare provider in Philadelphia that operates specifically for the LGBT community.  The center's array of HIV/AIDS-related and general health services benefit over 30,000 individuals annually.  Community programs are open to the public that include focus groups and outreach programs.  Other health care services include HIV and STD testing, food and housing options, mental and behavioral health services, and LGBT legal services.  The center seeks to break down cultural insensitivity that LGBT individuals may encounter in mainstream healthcare systems by communicating through knowledgeable health care and preventative services counselors.

Philly AIDS Thrift 
Philly AIDS Thrift is a charitable organization founded in 2005. Its goal is to raise money and distribute the proceeds to local organizations involved in the fight against HIV/AIDS.

PHL Pride Collective 
PHL Pride Collective was formed by LGBTQ+ community members in 2021 following the abrupt dissolvement of Philly Pride Presents following accusations of mismanagement, racism, and transphobia. The Collective is working to reimagine Philly Pride to be more community oriented, more revolutionary, and more in the spirit of LGBTQ+ Pride than ever before.

William Way LGBT Community Center 
The William Way LGBT Community Center, founded in 1975, was founded as the Gay and Lesbian Community Center of Philadelphia. It maintains an archive of local and regional LGBT information and culture, curates exhibitions, and offers community support.

Bars and entertainment
A diverse range of gay-friendly businesses and organizations are located within Philadelphia.  Some of these destinations include bars, nightclubs, performance theaters, shops, health centers, restaurants, and adult theaters .  Popular bars and nightclubs include Cockatoo, Level Up Bar and Lounge, (formerly Jock, formerly Boxers PHL), Knock Restaurant and Bar, Stir Lounge, Tabu Lounge & Sports Bar (former location of iCandy), Tavern on Camac, The Bike Stop, UBar (formerly Uncles), Voyeur (formerly Pure), Toast Walnut Bar & Kitchen (formerly Westbury), and Woody's.

Politics
Mayor of Philadelphia John Street was elected in 1999 with the help of LGBT activists. After his election he selected over twelve LGBT persons to work in the transition team.

Media
The oldest LGBT weekly newspaper is the Philadelphia Gay News, founded in 1976. Its purple vending machines are found in Center City.

Events 
The city hosts many LGBT-related events including Equality Forum, Blue Ball, the Philadelphia Trans Health Conference, Pride Parade, and OutFest.

See also
 LGBT culture
 Homosocialization

References 

^ Nickels, Thom                   Gay and Lesbian Philadelphia, Arcadia Publishing, 2002

External links 

 Mazzoni Center
PHL Pride Collective
William Way LGBT Community Center

 
LGBT history in the United States